Stenorhopalus is a genus of beetles in the family Cerambycidae, containing the following species:

 Stenorhopalus andina (Cerda, 1968)
 Stenorhopalus annulata (Philippi & Philippi, 1864)
 Stenorhopalus bicolor (Philippi, 1865)
 Stenorhopalus flavicans (Fairmaire & Germain, 1859)
 Stenorhopalus gracilipes (Blanchard in Gay, 1851)
 Stenorhopalus gracilis (Blanchard in Gay, 1851)
 Stenorhopalus lepturoides (Blanchard in Gay, 1851)
 Stenorhopalus macer (Newman, 1840)
 Stenorhopalus monsalvei (Cerda, 1954)
 Stenorhopalus nigriceps (Philippi, 1859)
 Stenorhopalus opaca (Fairmaire & Germain, 1859)
 Stenorhopalus rubriceps (Blanchard in Gay, 1851)
 Stenorhopalus rufofemorata (Fairmaire & Germain, 1859)
 Stenorhopalus rugosa (Fairmaire & Germain, 1861)
 Stenorhopalus valdiviensis (Cerda, 1995)
 Stenorhopalus virescens (Fairmaire & Germain, 1859)

References

Necydalinae
Cerambycidae genera